Amber Barrett (born 16 January 1996) is an Irish international footballer who plays for Frauen-Bundesliga club Turbine Potsdam. She made her debut for the Republic of Ireland women's national football team in September 2017. As a prolific forward, Barrett was the WNL Player of the Season in 2017 and top goalscorer in 2016, 2017 and 2018 with Peamount United.

Club career
Barett's father Shaun Paul has managed numerous clubs and county teams for Donegal GAA, as has her brother Luke. Another brother, Kane, has also been involved with Milford.

In 2017 Barrett, who was in the final year of a teacher training course at Maynooth University, quit Donegal GAA when a bout of glandular fever forced her to choose between Gaelic football and soccer. She was named Women's National League Player of the Season and Top Goalscorer in the 2017 season. In 2018 she lost out on the Player of the Season (to Rianna Jarrett) but retained her Top Goalscorer award, scoring 30 goals − including seven hat-tricks − in 21 league appearances.

In 2019 she went to Germany to play for 1. FC Köln, who were just promoted to the Frauen-Bundesliga. She spent three years in Cologne, playing in the Frauen-Bundesliga and 2. Frauen-Bundesliga, before signing for Turbine Potsdam in July 2022.

International career
National team coach Colin Bell gave Barrett her senior debut in September 2017, as a substitute in a 2–0 FIFA Women's World Cup qualifying win over Northern Ireland at Mourneview Park in Lurgan. She started an encouraging 0–0 draw away to European Champions the Netherlands in November 2017 and was praised by Bell for her performance.

In April 2018, Barrett's 87th-minute winning goal secured a 2–1 win over Slovakia at Tallaght Stadium, which kept Ireland in contention for World Cup qualification.

On 11 October 2022, Barrett's scored the only goal in a 1-0 win against Scotland to send Ireland to the World Cup for the first time.

International goals

References

External links

Amber Barrett at Football Association of Ireland (FAI)

1996 births
Living people
Republic of Ireland women's association footballers
Republic of Ireland women's international footballers
Association footballers from County Donegal
Peamount United F.C. players
Women's National League (Ireland) players
Women's association football forwards
Donegal ladies' Gaelic footballers
People from Letterkenny
Ladies' Gaelic footballers who switched code
Irish educators
Expatriate women's footballers in Germany
Irish expatriate sportspeople in Germany
Frauen-Bundesliga players
1. FC Köln (women) players
1. FFC Turbine Potsdam players